Charles Alexander Best (July 7, 1931 in Toronto, Ontario – March 25, 1978) was a Canadian politician, farmer, nurseryman and scientist. He was elected to the House of Commons of Canada in the 1957 election as a Member of the Progressive Conservative to represent the riding of Halton. He was re-elected in 1958 and defeated in the elections of 1962 and 1963. He was the son of Charles Herbert Best, the Canadian medical scientist, and one of the co-discoverers of insulin.

Further reading
Best, Henry B.M. Margaret and Charley: The Personal Story of Dr. Charles Best, the Co-Discoverer of Insulin (Dundern Press. 2003) . An account of Sandy Best's life, particularly outside politics, is given in some detail.

External links

1931 births
1978 deaths
Members of the House of Commons of Canada from Ontario
Politicians from Toronto
Progressive Conservative Party of Canada MPs
Scientists from Toronto